The KwaZulu-Natal midlands is an inland area of KwaZulu-Natal, South Africa that starts from Pietermaritzburg and ends before the Drakensberg mountain range.

Area
There are several small towns located in the midlands, including: Pietermaritzburg, Richmond, Ixopo, Kokstad, Howick, Merrivale, Hilton, Lions River, Dargle, Lidgetton, Balgowan, Nottingham Road, Rosetta and Mooi River.

The Midlands Meander is several tourism routes that include accommodation, art and crafts, leisure, activities and restaurant stops.

Some of South Africa's top private schools are located in the Midlands, including: Cowan House, Clifton Preparatory School, Treverton Preparatory School and College, Hilton College, Michaelhouse and St. Anne's Diocesan College.

The region is also becoming known as a wine-producing region.

Geography

Many parts of the Midlands Meander resemble the Northern European countryside as there are lush green pastures for cattle to graze on, in order  to produce milk and cheese and many species of European trees and bushes planted by the English and Dutch settlers.

Climate
The KwaZulu-Natal midlands can be hot and wet in summer, with average temperatures up to 30 °C, while winters are cool and dry, sometimes with snow and frost, with average temperatures of 6 °C.

See also
Marutswa Forest, a location within the Midlands

External links
Official tourism site
Midlands Meander official site

Geography of KwaZulu-Natal